Muhammad Anis Qureshi is a Pakistani politician who was a Member of the Provincial Assembly of the Punjab, from May 2013 to May 2018.

Early life and education
Mr Muhammad Anis Qureshi son of Mr Muhammad Yasin was born on March 10, 1946, in Kasur.

He has the degree of Master of Arts in English which he obtained from Government College, Lahore in 1967 and the degree of Master in Development Administration which he received in 1990 from University of Birmingham. He graduated in Law in 2005 from Bahauddin Zakariya University and has the degree of Bachelor of Laws.

Career as a Civil Servant 
He joined Civil Service after qualifying the Punjab provincial competitive civil service examination and served as Deputy Commissioner and DCO Khusab district during 1992-93 and 2005 respectively; as Deputy Commissioner Narowal district during 1999-2001; as DCO, Mandi Bahauddin district during 2001-03; as DCO Muzaffargarh during 2004; as DCO (BPS20) Layyah during 2004-05; and retired in 2006 while serving as Member Board of Revenue Punjab. He was also sent for higher studies by Government of Punjab on British Council Scholarship in 1989 for one year.

Foreign Visits 
He has visited UK, Canada, USA and Saudi Arabia in different capacities.

Political career

He was elected to the Provincial Assembly of the Punjab as a candidate of Pakistan Muslim League (Nawaz) from Constituency PP-176 (Kasur-II) in 2013 Pakistani general election.

References

Living people
Punjab MPAs 2013–2018
1946 births
Pakistan Muslim League (N) politicians
People from Kasur District